Lake Killarney is a subdivision surrounding a private lake located to the west of the Fox River in unincorporated Cary and Crystal Lake, Illinois. Lake Killarney residents have exclusive lake rights to an  spring fed lake.

The Lake Killarney Home Owners Association was incorporated March 15, 1962, and is the sole owner of the "Common Properties" known as Lake Killarney (the lake itself), its two beaches, parkland areas, along with various sections of property surrounding the lake.

Lake Killarney Lake 
Lake Killarney  is a  glacial lake located in McHenry County, northwest of Cary. Lake Killarney serves as a recreational lake for its residences. Residents practice catch and release to assure the fish stay plentiful. A valid Illinois Fishing license is required. Swimming, fishing, row-boating or canoeing, and sail-boating are the major uses of the lake. Access is limited to subdivision members only. No motors of any kind are allowed on the lake.

See also
List of lakes in Illinois

References

External links
 

Killarney
Bodies of water of McHenry County, Illinois